An EMD SD45X is a 6-axle experimental diesel-electric locomotive built by General Motors Electro-Motive Division between June 1970 and February 1971. Power was provided by an EMD 645E3A 20-cylinder engine which generated . 7 examples of this locomotive model were built for American railroads. 6 of these units would end up in service with Southern Pacific Railroad. One was rebuilt in 1980 by Morrison-Knudsen into an SD45Xm with a long hood from a scrapped DD35.

References 
 
 Sarberenyi, Robert. EMD SD45X Original Owners. Retrieved on August 27, 2006

Further reading 
 

SD45X
C-C locomotives
Experimental locomotives
Diesel-electric locomotives of the United States
Railway locomotives introduced in 1970
Standard gauge locomotives of the United States